Bodwesango Senior High School is a mixed second cycle institution in Bodwesango in Adansi North District in the Ashanti Region of Ghana. In 2009, the school took part in the Inter-school debate under the topic: "Leaders are born but not made" where they emerged the first runner-up.

History 
In 2011, Nana Osarfo Akowuah was the headmaster of the school. In 2021, Most Reverend John Yaw Afoakwah was the Chaplain and tutor at the school.

References 

High schools in Ghana
Public schools in Ghana